The gorilla–human last common ancestor (GHLCA, GLCA, or G/H LCA) is the last species that the tribes Hominini and Gorillini (i.e. the chimpanzee–human last common ancestor on one hand and gorillas on the other) share as a common ancestor. It is estimated to have lived  (TGHLCA) during the late Miocene.

The fossil find of Nakalipithecus nakayamai are closest in age to the GHLCA.

References

See also
 Gibbon–human last common ancestor
 History of hominoid taxonomy
 List of human evolution fossils (with images)
 Orangutan–human last common ancestor

Human evolution
Homininae
Last common ancestors